ShoeDazzle is an American online fashion subscription service based in El Segundo, California. Each month the company debuts a selection of shoes, handbags and jewelry, and provides its members with a showroom curated to their indicated fashion preferences.

History
The company was founded by Kim Kardashian, Brian Lee, Robert Shapiro and M.J. Eng in 2009.

In 2013, fashion expert Rachel Zoe joined ShoeDazzle as Chief Stylist.

ShoeDazzle merged with JustFab, Inc. in 2013.

Funding and growth
In November 2009, ShoeDazzle secured its first round of $7 million funding from Polaris Ventures, a venture capital firm specializing in early-stage investments. 
 
In April 2010, Lightspeed Venture Partners led a $13 million round of financing. In May 2011, ShoeDazzle secured $40 million in funding led by Silicon Valley venture capital firm Andreessen Horowitz.

In September 2011, Bill Strauss, the former CEO of Provide Commerce (which operates sites such as ProFlowers), became ShoeDazzle's CEO. Co-founder Lee became chairman. In March 2012, ShoeDazzle dropped its $39.95 monthly subscription model and expanded into apparel, handbags, weddings and lingerie.

In July 2012, ShoeDazzle signed up a record one million new members. From 2011 to 2012, ShoeDazzle grew from 3 million to 10 million members.

In August 2013, ShoeDazzle was acquired by rival online fashion subscription service JustFab. The two companies continued to run independently as separate brands.

References

Companies based in Los Angeles
Kim Kardashian
Shoe brands
American companies established in 2009
Clothing companies established in 2009
Retail companies established in 2009
Internet properties established in 2009
Shoe companies of the United States
Subscription services